Godzilla is a variable star in the Sunburst galaxy at redshift z = 2.38 (or 10.9 billion light years from Earth), observed through the gravitational lens PSZ1 G311.65-18.48.
It was originally identified as a possible transient event in images taken with the Hubble Space Telescope (HST).

As of October 2022, it is the most luminous star that can be currently observed.  This is possible thanks to the fact that the star is believed to be undergoing an episode of temporary increased luminosity that has lasted at least seven years, combined with an estimated magnification of at least a factor of 2000.

Some spectral features in Godzilla resemble those of other variable stars in the Milky Way Galaxy such as Eta Carinae suggesting that Godzilla could be close to the end of its life.

The extreme magnification of Godzilla is partially due to a nearby substructure, probably a dwarf galaxy, not seen in the HST images, that is also close to the critical curve of the cluster. This unobserved substructure is believed to be dominated by dark matter.

See also
 List of star extremes
 List of the most distant astronomical objects

Notes

References

Extragalactic stars
Gravitational lensing
Hubble Space Telescope